Hugh Pigot may refer to:
 Hugh Pigot (Royal Navy admiral) (1722–1792), admiral and commander-in-chief of the Royal Navy's West Indian fleet from 1782
 Hugh Pigot (Royal Navy captain) (1769–1797), his son, brutal officer, killed by his own men during the mutiny on HMS Hermione
 Hugh Pigot (19th century admiral) (1775–1857), the nephew and cousin of the above, commander-in-chief at Cork 1844-1847